Laura Waem (born 5 August 1997) is a Belgian artistic gymnast. She competed at the 2013 World Artistic Gymnastics Championships. She and teammate, Gaelle Mys, qualified to the all-around final where she placed 21st with a score of 51.932, respectively. She also competed on the Belgium women's artistic gymnastics team at the 2016 Olympic Games.

References

External links
Laura Waem at Fédération Internationale de Gymnastique

1997 births
Living people
Belgian female artistic gymnasts
Gymnasts at the 2016 Summer Olympics
Olympic gymnasts of Belgium
Belgian women gymnasts